On Stage is the fourth album by singer-songwriter duo Loggins and Messina, released in 1974. As their first live album, it was released as a double album and featured a side-long version of their hit song "Vahevala".

Track listing
Sides shown are for the original dual-record vinyl released by Columbia records in 1974. The CD release is also a double-disc set; the first disc consists of sides No. 1 and No. 2, and the second contains sides No. 3 and No. 4.

Side #1
"House at Pooh Corner" (Kenny Loggins) – 2:40 (lead singer: Kenny Loggins)
"Danny's Song" (Loggins) – 3:55 (lead singer: Kenny Loggins)
"You Could Break My Heart" (Loggins) – 3:06 (lead singer: Kenny Loggins)
"Lady of My Heart" (Loggins) – 1:50 (lead singer: Kenny Loggins)
"Long Tail Cat" (Loggins) – 3:23 (lead singer: Kenny Loggins)
"Listen to a Country Song" (Jim Messina, Al Garth) – 2:33 (lead singer: Jim Messina)
"Holiday Hotel" (Messina, Garth) – 2:08 (lead singer: Jim Messina)

Side #2
"Just Before the News" (Messina) – 1:08 (instrumental)
"Angry Eyes" (Loggins, Messina) – 10:06 (lead singers: Kenny Loggins, Jim Messina)
"Golden Ribbons" (Messina) – 5:57 (lead singers: Jim Messina, Kenny Loggins, Larry Sims, Al Garth)
"Another Road" (Loggins) – 2:22 (lead singer: Kenny Loggins)

Side #3
"Vahevala" (Dan Loggins, Dann Lottermoser) – 21:00 (lead singer: Kenny Loggins)

Side #4
"Back to Georgia" (Loggins) – 2:59 (lead singer: Kenny Loggins)
"Trilogy – 12:12:  Lovin' Me (Messina, Murray MacLeod) (lead singer: Jim Messina),  To Make a Woman Feel Wanted (Loggins, Messina) (lead singers: Kenny Loggins, Jim Messina), Peace of Mind" (Messina) (lead singer: Kenny Loggins)
"Your Mama Don't Dance" (Loggins, Messina) – 3:02 (lead singers: Jim Messina, Kenny Loggins)
"Nobody But You" (Messina) – 4:32 (lead singer: Jim Messina)

Personnel
Kenny Loggins – vocals, rhythm guitar, acoustic guitar, harmonica
Jim Messina – vocals, lead guitar, acoustic guitar, mandolin
Merel Bregante – drums, backing vocals
Jon Clarke – flute, tenor saxophone, baritone saxophone, percussion
Al Garth – violin, tenor saxophone, recorder, alto saxophone, percussion
Larry Sims – bass guitar, backing vocals

Production
Producer: Jim Messina
Engineers: Alex Kazanegras and John Fiore
Mastering: Vic Anesini
Photography: Ed Caraeff, David Gahr, Bob Jenkins, Jim Marshall, Ellen Wolff, Frank Zinn, Jenny Messina
Artwork: Ron Coro, Ron Jaramillo
Graphic design: Rev. Richard White
Liner notes: Ellen Wolff
Recording locations: Winterland, San Francisco, April 28,29, 1972; Carnegie Hall, New York, March 1,2, 1973; Orpheum Theatre, Boston, March 4, 1973.

Charts
Album – Billboard (United States)

References

External links

Loggins and Messina albums
1974 live albums
Albums produced by Jim Messina (musician)
Columbia Records live albums
Albums recorded at Carnegie Hall
Albums produced by Kenny Loggins